Ivan Konstantinovich Grigorovich (26 January 1853 – 3 March 1930) served as Imperial Russia's last Naval Minister from 1911 until the onset of the 1917 revolution.

Early career
Grigorovich was from a Russian noble family and opted for a military career after the death of his father, Konstantin Ivanovich Grigorovich. Graduating from the Sea Cadet Corps in 1874 Grigorovich served as an officer on various ships. In 1893, he was promoted to captain, 1st rank. In 1896 to 1898 he was appointed Russian naval attaché in London. In 1899 he was appointed to command the battleship , which was being completed in France. In 1903 Tsesarevich sailed to Port Arthur.

During the surprise Japanese torpedo boat attack on Port Arthur, starting the Russo-Japanese War, Tsesarevich was hit by a Japanese torpedo but remained afloat and contributed to driving off the Japanese attack. Grigorovich was awarded the Order of St Vladimir, 3rd class with swords for his role in the battle. After the death of Admiral Stepan Makarov, he was promoted to rear admiral and appointed chief of Port Arthur's port. Under his effective management, Russian Pacific squadron had no shortage of coal, munitions or any supplies during the Siege of Port Arthur. In 1904 he was also awarded with the Order of Saint Stanislaus, 1st class.

As admiral
After the end of the war Grigorovich was appointed chief of staff of the Black Sea Fleet. He was appointed commander of the naval base at Libau in 1908 awarded the Order of St Anna, 1st class, and became commander of the naval base at Kronstadt in 1909. In 1909 he was appointed Deputy Navy Minister and promoted to admiral in 1911. From 1911 until the onset of revolution in 1917 he served as Russia's Naval Minister, overseeing a huge rearmament programme. The naval build-up included building four Gangut-class battleships for the Baltic Fleet and four Imperatritsa Mariya-class battleships for the Black Sea Fleet. He personally visited the shipyards and the different fleets of Imperial Russia to supervise the progress of the construction of warships, training of crew and sailors. He enjoyed good relationships with the Duma and used his popularity to secure huge extra funds to expand the navy. He remained in charge of the Imperial Russian Navy through most of World War I. He was chairman of the Admiralty Board from 1911 to 1915, and was a member of the State Council from 1913 to 1917.

Grigorovich was politically sympathetic to the Octobrist Party and was nominated as a candidate for Prime Minister in 1916; however his candidacy was rejected due to objections from dowager tsarina Maria Feodorovna over Grigorovich's liberal views.

Post-Revolution
Grigorovich was dismissed from office in the wake of the February Revolution on 31 March 1917. He served on the Historical Commission and was asked to write his memoirs (which were only published in 1993, after the fall of the Soviet Union. However, he was dismissed in October 1921 due to downsizing, and lived in extreme poverty, suffering frequently from pneumonia and for sometime lived in the apartment of Aleksey Krylov. From his retirement he asked for permission to get medical treatment abroad, and left for France in the autumn of 1924. He lived in exile in France in poverty until his death in 1930, with an income by selling his own oil paintings of seascapes. On his death, he was initially buried in the Russian Cemetery in Menton. In 2005 the urn containing his ashes was taken aboard the cruiser , which carried his remains to Novorossiysk. The ashes were then flown to Saint Petersburg and buried in his family vault in the Alexander Nevsky Lavra in accordance with his will.

The Russian Navy has named the first of the Admiral Grigorovich-class frigates after Ivan Grigorovich.

He was awarded Order of Prince Danilo I, Order of the Cross of Takovo and a number of other decorations.

Notes

References

External links

 Short biography

1853 births
1930 deaths
Government ministers of Russia
Imperial Russian Navy admirals
Politicians of the Russian Empire
Members of the State Council (Russian Empire)
Russian military personnel of the Russo-Japanese War
Russian military personnel of World War I
Recipients of the Order of Saint Stanislaus (Russian), 1st class
Recipients of the Order of St. Anna, 1st class
Recipients of the Order of St. Vladimir, 3rd class
Admirals of World War I
Burials at Nikolskoe Cemetery
Naval Cadet Corps alumni